Franc Santana Paiva (born 22 August 1992) is a Brazilian Forward footballer who plays for a Cambodian club  Boeung Ket Angkor.

Career statistics

Club

References

1992 births
Living people
Brazilian footballers
Brazilian expatriate footballers
Association football forwards
Campeonato de Portugal (league) players
Kategoria e Parë players
Sport Club Corinthians Paulista players
Esporte Clube Noroeste players
Associação Esportiva Santacruzense players
Associação Atlética Portuguesa (Santos) players
Ypiranga Futebol Clube players
Casa Pia A.C. players
Brazilian expatriate sportspeople in Portugal
Expatriate footballers in Portugal
Brazilian expatriate sportspeople in Albania
Expatriate footballers in Albania
Brazilian expatriate sportspeople in Cambodia
Expatriate footballers in Cambodia